Mass graves in Iraq have become well known since the 2003 invasion of Iraq toppled the regime of Saddam Hussein. International Experts estimated that 300,000 victims could be in these mass graves alone. The mass graves mostly included the remains of Shia Muslims and ethnic Kurds, who were killed for opposing the regime between 1983 and 1991.

Background

Some of the information below is taken from Fact Sheet - Bureau of Democracy, Human Rights and Labor and Bureau of Public Affairs

Mass graves in Iraq are characterized as unmarked sites containing at least six bodies. Some can be identified by mounds of earth piled above the ground or as deep pits that appear to have been filled. Some older graves are more difficult to identify, having been covered by vegetation and debris over time. Sites have been discovered in all regions of the country and contain members of every major religious and ethnic group in Iraq as well as foreign nationals, including Kuwaitis and Saudis. Over 250 sites have been reported, of which approximately 40 have been confirmed to date. Over one million Iraqis are believed to be missing in Iraq as a result of executions, wars and defections, of whom hundreds of thousands are thought to be in mass graves. Most of the graves discovered to date correspond to one of five major atrocities perpetrated by the regime.

According to Kurdistan Regional Government in Iraq, many mass graves in Kurdistan contain Iraqi Kurds, who were killed in a genocidal act because of their ethnicity.

1979 crackdown on Shia political parties and Shia activists. This period involved thousands of "Revolutionary Court" trials which meant  groups of 200-500 Shia young men and women as young as 13 would be hoarded together and sentenced to death.
1982 the  aggressive tactics by Saddam regime to crush any Shia movements, following the kidnapping and brutal murder of a key Shia Leader Ayatollah Mohamed Baqir Al-Sadr. In this year tens of thousands of Iraq young men, women and children were sentenced to death under the accusation of joining a political party. Those who were lucky - after unimaginable torture and interrogation - would be sentenced to Lifetime imprisonment.
The 1983 attack against Kurdish citizens belonging to the Barzani tribe, 8,000 of whom were rounded up by the regime in northern Iraq and executed in deserts at great distances from their homes. 
The 1988 Anfal campaign, during which as many as 182,000 Iraqi Kurds disappeared. Most of the men were separated from their families and were executed in deserts in the west and south-west of Iraq. The remains of some of their wives and children have also been found in mass graves. 
Chemical attacks against Kurdish villages from 1986 to 1988, including the Halabja attack, when the Iraqi Air Force dropped sarin, VX and tabun chemical agents on the civilian population, killing 5,000 people immediately and causing long-term medical problems, related deaths, and birth defects among the progeny of thousands more. 
The 1991 massacre of Iraqi Shia Muslims after the Shia uprising at the end of the Gulf war, in which tens of thousands of soldiers and civilians in regions such as Basra, Karbala, Najaf, Nasiriya, Amara and Al-Hillah were killed. Thousands of homes were demolished and vast areas of Iraq's marches were dried up causing devastating effect on the lives of people and the environment.
Then, in March 1999, thousands more were believed to have been arrested, imprisoned and in some cases executed after a second uprising broke out after the killing of a prominent Shiite cleric.

 In May 2003, Amnesty International reported finding a grave containing 40 bodies at Abul Khasib in southern Iraq, which is almost exclusively Shia, thought to contain bodies from the 1991 Shia uprising.
A massacre of Kurds in 1991, which targeted civilians and soldiers who fought for autonomy in northern Iraq after the Gulf war, also resulted in mass graves.

US Senate committee investigations

Facts on the Fact Sheet appear to have been those gathered by US Senate committee investigations.

 South of Baghdad a mass grave was uncovered which is thought to contain 60,000 Shia victims of the 1991 popular uprising which was brutally quelled by Saddam's Republican Guards.
The remains of 113 Kurds, most of whom were women, children and teenagers, have been uncovered near Samawah.
Discovery of mass grave sites in Iraq has been done through the analysis of satellite imagery.  This has 18 suspected sites, two of which are excavated having 28 and 10 adult males.
3,115 corpses uncovered in Mahaweel is one of the largest found believed to contain Iraqi Shia. (11/2003).
2,000 corpses found in the Shia city of Hillah.
Tony Blair has stated 'We've already discovered, just so far, the remains of 400,000 people in mass graves.' (11/03) The actual number of corpses found was closer to 5,000 (2004).
 In 2004, BBC reported finding Babies in mass graves dating to Saddam's era. "The skeletons of unborn babies and toddlers clutching toys are being unearthed, the investigators said." 
 In April 2011, a mass grave was found containing 800 bodies in Anbar (West of Iraq), believed to be from the 1991 Shia uprising. Those bodies seemed to have been executed (point blank) and buried.

The recovery of corpses is reported to be slow due to local violence and the need for identification of corpses, isolation of remains, forensics, etc.  Relatives have rushed to the graves in remembrance of missing relatives.

Popular culture
The 2014 film The Blue Man, which is related to The New York Times article titled "Uncovering Iraq's Horrors in Desert Graves" written by John F. Burns, is about The Blue Man mass grave located in Al-Mahawil.

See also
Human rights in post-invasion Iraq
Human rights in Saddam Hussein's Iraq
Human rights in ISIL-controlled territory

References

External links
In Saddam's killing fields, BBC News, 14 May 2003
Mass Graves of Iraq: Uncovering Atrocities, United States Department of State, December 19, 2003
Babies found in Iraqi mass grave, BBC News, 13 October 2004
Iraq: State of the Evidence - Photographs: Mass Graves and Documentary Evidence of Crimes from Saddam Hussein's Regime, Human Rights Watch
Iraq's Legacy of Terror: Mass Graves, USAID
Mass Graves: Iraq
Pictures of mass graves being exhumed in Iraq

1979 establishments in Iraq
Buildings and structures completed in 1979
2003 archaeological discoveries
Burials in Iraq
Cemeteries in Iraq[
Human rights abuses in Iraq
Iraq
Massacres in Iraq
Modern history of Iraq
Persecution of Kurds in Iraq
Shia Islam in Iraq
Racism in the Arab world